Iota Octantis, Latinized, from ι Octantis is a double star in the southern circumpolar constellation Octans. The "A" component has an apparent magnitude of 5.83, making it faintly visible to the naked eye under ideal conditions, but the "B" component can't be seen due to its faintness.

Iota Octantis A has a classification of K0 III, which indicates that it is an evolved K-type star that exhausted hydrogen at its core and left the main sequence.

References

Octans
K-type giants
111482
063031
4870
Durchmusterung objects
Double stars
Octantis, 16